Francisco Javier Obregón Espinoza (born 28 January 1958) is a Mexican politician affiliated with the Party of the Democratic Revolution (PRD). He has also worked with the Labor Party. He served as Senator of the LX and LXI Legislatures of the Mexican Congress, representing Baja California Sur. He also served as Deputy during the LIX Legislature.

References

1958 births
Living people
Members of the Senate of the Republic (Mexico)
Members of the Chamber of Deputies (Mexico)
Members of the Congress of Baja California Sur
Municipal presidents in Baja California Sur
National Action Party (Mexico) politicians
Party of the Democratic Revolution politicians
20th-century Mexican politicians
21st-century Mexican politicians
Politicians from Baja California Sur
People from Comondú Municipality